Pioneer Monument or Pioneer Memorial may refer to:

in Canada
 Pioneer Monument Obelisk (Montreal), Quebec

in the United States
 Pioneer Monument (San Francisco), California
 Pioneer Memorial (Denver, Colorado) or Pioneer Monument (Denver, Colorado), in the Civic Center Historic District (Denver, Colorado) (in the Denver Civic Center)
 Pioneer Memorial (Houston), Texas

See also
Pioneer (disambiguation), for sculptures named "The Pioneer" or "Pioneer"